USS Peerless is a name used more than once by the U.S. Navy:

  built as Eagle in 1917 by Union Iron Works, San Francisco, California.
 , laid down 14 April 1941 by Delaware Bay Shipbuilding Co., Leesburg, New Jersey.

United States Navy ship names